Kim Jin-seong (born May 8, 2001) is a South Korean actor.

Filmography

Television series 

Notes

Film

External links 

Living people
2001 births
21st-century South Korean male actors
South Korean male television actors
South Korean male film actors